Zappanale is an annual music festival held outside Bad Doberan, a German town previously part of East Germany. The festival was first held in 1990, and the program features various bands performing the music of the late composer and guitarist Frank Zappa. Many musicians who played with Zappa have performed at the festival over the years.

Background

Many of the festival's organizers originate from East Germany, and grew up in a period where Zappa's music was considered unacceptable by several Eastern European communist countries. One of the festival's founders, Wolfhard Kutz, was persecuted by the East German secret police, the Stasi, for being a Zappa fan. When all Stasi files were declassified by the German government in 1992, Kutz learned that his file stated that he "knows how to influence the youth with Zappa". When the Berlin Wall fell in 1989, Kutz could openly enjoy his passion for Zappa's music, and he founded the fan club "Arf-society". The Zappanale premiered the year after, as what was just an extended party with only one band playing some Zappa songs. Since then, the festival has grown, and more than 2,000 attend the festival in a weekend in August. The Arf Society became an officially registered organization in 1993.

In 2002, the organizers helped raise money to have Czech sculptor Václav Česák make a bronze bust of Zappa, which is now placed in the centre of Bad Doberan.

Lawsuit 

In November 2007, the festival was sued by the heirs of Frank Zappa, the Zappa Family Trust, for use of the Zappa name and image without permission. Court hearings were held in Düsseldorf in August 2008, and the involved parties were given time to reach an out-of-court settlement. In January 2009, the court ruled against Zappa's heirs for lack of proof that they actively used their trademarks in Germany. Such activity was assessed as a prerequisite for winning the lawsuit.

References

External links
 Official site
 Performer Ray White's official site
 Performer Ike Willis' official site
 Performer Project-Object's official site

Events in Mecklenburg-Western Pomerania
Music in Mecklenburg-Western Pomerania
Music festivals in Germany
Bad Doberan
Summer events in Germany